Ballbreaker is an album by AC/DC.

Ballbreaker or Ballbreakers may also refer to:

 "Ballbreaker" (song)
 Ballbreakers (game show)
 Ball Breaker, a -style video game
 Ball Breaker, in the manga story Steel Ball Run
 Ballbreaker World Tour, a 1996 AC/DC concert tour